Hafid Abdessadak (born 4 February 1974 or 24 February 1974) is a Moroccan former footballer. Abdessadak has played for Raja Casablanca, FAR Rabat, OC Safi and MAS Fez. He represented Morocco four times and was selected for the 2006 Africa Cup of Nations.

References

1974 births
Living people
Association football midfielders
Moroccan footballers
Morocco international footballers
Botola players
Raja CA players
AS FAR (football) players
Maghreb de Fès players